Maba or MABA may refer to:

 Maba, a plant genus now included in Diospyros
 Maba, Shaoguan (马坝镇), town in Qujiang District, Shaoguan, Guangdong, China
 Maba, Xuyi County (马坝镇), town in Xuyi County, Jiangsu, China
 Maba, Indonesia, town in North Maluku
 Maba language (Indonesia), an Austronesian language of Indonesia
 Maba language, a Nilo-Saharan language of Chad and Sudan
 Maba people, an ethnic group of Chad
 Maba Man, a prehistoric hominid from Maba, Guangdong, China
 Maba, Thung Khao Luang, an administrative division in Thung Khao Luang District, Thailand
 3-Aminobenzoic acid, an organic compound
 Mandi Bamora railway station, in Madhya Pradesh, India